Laurance Mastick Hyde (February 2, 1892 – 1978) was a chief justice of the Missouri Supreme Court. He was a Republican.

Hyde was born in Princeton, Missouri and served in the U.S. Army during World War I. He was the justice and then the chief justice of the Missouri Supreme Court.

In 1949, Hyde co-founded and became the first president of the Conference of Chief Justices, which he helped create along with the Council of State Governments and several private foundations at a meeting in St. Louis called by him, along with New Jersey Chief Justice Arthur T. Vanderbilt and Nebraska Chief Justice Robert G. Simmons.

Some of his family members were also involved in politics. His father, Ira B. Hyde, was a representative from Missouri, and his brother, Arthur M. Hyde, was a Governor of Missouri.

References

External links
 Conference of Chief Justices

1892 births
1978 deaths
Chief Justices of the Supreme Court of Missouri
20th-century American judges
People from Princeton, Missouri
Missouri Republicans